Henry M. Jackson High School is a public high school in Mill Creek, Washington, United States. Named after the late Henry M. Jackson, an Everett native and former U.S. Senator, the school opened on September 7, 1994, as the third high school in the Everett School District.

Other high schools in the Everett School District are Cascade High School, Everett High School, and Sequoia Alternative School. The school initially served only grades 9–10 so that students at Everett and Cascade could graduate without transferring; it fully opened for grades 9–12 in 1996.

Intermediate schools that feed into Jackson are Heatherwood Middle School, located adjacent to the high school, and Gateway Middle School, located in the Silver Firs area northeast of Mill Creek.

Academics 
The school offers an array of academic options including Honors, College, and Advanced Placement classes such as Honors English, University of Washington English, UW Computer-Science, AP Literature and Composition, AP Language, AP Art, AP Calculus, AP Statistics, AP Psychology, AP Biology, AP Chemistry, AP Physics, AP World History, AP US History, AP Government, AP Capstone, and AP Environmental Science.

Activities 
The school offers a variety of clubs and extra-curricular activities for students, including Band, FIRST Robotics, ASB, TSA, Science and Engineering Research, DECA, MIT Launch Club, FCCLA, HOSA, National Honor Society, Key Club, LINK Crew, French Club, German Club, Project Green, Hi-Q, Dance Team, Theatre Society, Knowledge Bowl, Math Club, Model UN, Mock Trial, Art Club, and Multicultural Club.

Each year, Jackson holds an annual food drive, collecting food from local grocery stores.

Hazing incident and food fight
In 2002 seven students were accused of paddling up to 30 freshmen as part of an apparent initiation rite and were suspended from school. The students targeted freshmen boys to spank with a wooden paddle, police and school officials said. Until this event, a paddle had been used to represent school spirit, but was changed because of this event.

In 2009, 14 students were expelled for starting and participating in a food fight. Though most students tried hard to not get involved, this caused senior prom to be temporarily suspended, and a plan of action had to be drawn up so all students knew appropriate behavior.

Sports
Throughout all of its past years, Henry M. Jackson has been well known for its sports. In 2006, boys' baseball won the 4A State championship. In 2008 and 2014, girls' swimming won first in state. In 2010 girls' volleyball won first in state. Also in 2008, both girls' and boys' basketball made it to state. In 2010 boys' basketball won second in state. In the fall of 2010, football won the WESCO championship for the third straight year. In addition, boys' cross country in the fall of 2009 was ranked first in the nation and was only beat by the second in the nation later on. This was the boys' second consecutive year placing 2nd in the 4A Washington State Cross Country Championships. In the fall of 2008, all of the fall sports except volleyball made it to the playoffs. Other sports like track have also met with success. In the 2009–2010 season for volleyball the girls won state. On March 2, 2013 the Jackson boys' basketball team placed second in state, losing the championship game to Curtis High School and finished the season with a 26–1 record, losing only the championship game. Six of the seven players used were juniors.

Notable alumni
 Adam Christian Clark, filmmaker
 Brent Lillibridge, Major League Baseball position player for the Chicago Cubs
 Ramsey Nijem, wrestler; mixed martial artist for the Ultimate Fighting Championship in the Lightweight Division
 Travis Snider, professional baseball player for the Baltimore Orioles
 Chris Taylor, member of the band Grizzly Bear
 Tati Westbrook, YouTuber
 Rheanne Wirkkala, intelligence analyst and policy advisor

References

External links 
 School home page
Seattle Times School Guide - Jackson High

Educational institutions established in 1994
1994 establishments in Washington (state)
High schools in Snohomish County, Washington
Public high schools in Washington (state)